The following is a detailed results break down of the 2017 New Zealand general election, which was held on 23 September 2017.

Preliminary results were gradually released after polling booths closed at 19:00 (NZST) on 23 September. The preliminary count only includes advance ordinary and election day ordinary votes; it does not include any special votes. Special votes include votes from those who enrolled after the deadline of 23 August, those who voted outside their electorate (this includes all overseas votes), hospital votes, and those voters enrolled on the unpublished roll.

All voting papers, counterfoils and electoral rolls are returned to the electorate's returning officer for a mandatory recount; this also includes approving and counting any special votes, and compiling a master roll to ensure no voter has voted more than once. Official results, including all recounted ordinary votes and special votes, are due to be released by 14:00 on Saturday 7 October 2017.

Parties and candidates have three working days after the release of the official results to apply for a judicial recount. These recounts take place under the auspices of a District Court judge (the Chief District Court Judge in case of a nationwide recount), and may delay the return of the election writ by a few days.

Party vote

| colspan=12 align=center| 
|- style="text-align:center;"
! colspan=2 rowspan=2 style="width:213px;" | Party
! Colspan=3 | Party vote
! Colspan=3 | Electorate vote
! Colspan=4 | Seats
|- style="text-align:center;"
! Votes
! %
! Change(pp)
! Votes
! %
! Change(pp)
! List
! Electorate
! Total
! +/-
|-
| 
| 1,152,075
| 44.45
| 2.59
| 1,114,367
| 44.05
| 2.0
| 15
| 41
| 56
| 4
|-
| 
| 956,184
| 36.89
| 11.76
| 958,155
| 37.88
| 3.75
| 17
| 29
| 46
| 14
|-
| 
| 186,706
| 7.20
| 1.46
| 137,816
| 5.45
| 2.32
| 9
| 0
| 9
| 2
|-
| 
| 162,443
| 6.27
| 4.43
| 174,725
| 6.91
| 0.15
| 8
| 0
| 8
| 6
|-
| 
| 13,075
| 0.50
| 0.19
| 25,471
| 1.01
| 0.17
| 0
| 1
| 1
| 
|-
| 
| 63,261
| 2.44
| new
| 26,034
| 1.03
| new
| 0
| 0
| 0
| new
|-
| 
| 30,580
| 1.18
| 0.14
| 53,247
| 2.11
| 0.32
| 0
| 0
| 0
| 2
|-
| 
| 8,075
| 0.31
| 0.14
| 4,144
| 0.16
| 0.05
| 0
| 0
| 0
| 
|-
| 
| 6,253
| 0.24
| 3.75
| 6,115
| 0.24
| 3.21
| 0
| 0
| 0
| 
|-
| 
| 3,642
| 0.14
| 1.28
| 8,196
| 0.32
| 1.26
| 0
| 0
| 0
| 
|-
| 

| 3,005
| 0.12
| 0.10
| 3,003
| 0.12
| 0.07
| 0
| 0
| 0
| 
|-
| 
| 1,890
| 0.07
| new
| —
| —
| —
| 0
| 0
| 0
| new
|-
| 
| 1,782
| 0.07
| 0.15
| 1,285
| 0.05
| 0.58
| 0
| 0
| 0
| 1
|-
| 
| 1,620
| 0.06
| new
| 1,357
| 0.05
| new
| 0
| 0
| 0
| new
|-
| 
| 806
| 0.03
| 0.04
| 1,794
| 0.20
| 0.13
| 0
| 0
| 0
| 
|-
| 

| 499
| 0.02
| 1.40
| —
| —
| 1.58
| 0
| 0
| 0
| 
|-
| style="background-color:#ffffff" |
| style="text-align:left;" |Unregistered Parties
| —
| —
| —
| 1,073
| 0.04
| 
| —
| 0
| 0
| 
|-
| 
| —
| —
| —
| 12,749
| 0.50
| 0.34
| —
| 0
| 0
| 
|-
! colspan=2 style="text-align:left;" | Valid votes
! 2,591,896
! 98.54
! 0.20
! 2,529,531
! 96.17
! 0.20
! Colspan=4 |
|-
| colspan=2 style="text-align:left;" | Informal votes
| 10,793
| 0.41
| 0.03
| 30,554
| 1.16
| 0.02
| Colspan=4 |
|-
| colspan=2 style="text-align:left;" | Disallowed votes
| 27,484
| 1.04
| 0.18
| 70,088
| 2.66
| 0.23
| Colspan=4 |
|-
| colspan=2 style="text-align:left;" | Below electoral threshold
| 121,413
| 4.62
| —
| —
| —
| —
| Colspan=4 |
|-
! colspan=2 style="text-align:left;" | Total
! 2,630,173
! 100
!
! 2,630,173
! 100
!
! 49
! 71
! 120
! 1
|-
| colspan=2 style="text-align:left;" | Eligible voters and Turnout
| 3,298,009
| 79.75
| 1.85
| 3,298,009
| 79.75
| 1.85
| Colspan=4 |
|}

Comparison of preliminary and official results

Electorate results

At the 2014 general elections, four electorates were won by candidates with a margin of fewer than 1,000 votes: Auckland Central, Hutt South, Ōhāriu and Te Tai Tokerau.

Hamilton West is considered to be New Zealand's bellwether seat. Since the formation of the electorate in 1969, the winning candidate has been from the party that has gone on to form the government, with the exception of 1993 when it elected a Labour MP while National went on to form the government (albeit with a one-seat majority). Along with Hamilton West, Maungakiekie and Rotorua have been bellwethers in the MMP era, swinging with the government at every election since 1996.

The table below shows the results of the 2017 general election:

Key:

|-
 | colspan =10 style="background-color:#FFDEAD" | Māori electorates
|-

|}

Notes:

Party vote by electorate

The following is a breakdown of the party vote received in each electorate. Only parties which received at least one percent of the nationwide party vote are listed.

List results

Successful list MPs

Unsuccessful list candidates

MP changes

Notable MPs
Following the retirement of Peter Dunne, National leader Bill English (list) became the new Father of the House, having served as an MP continuously since 1990.
23-year-old Chlöe Swarbrick (Green, list) became the new Baby of the House. She is the youngest MP to be elected to Parliament since 1975.

Demographics

Gender representation
Of the 120 MPs elected, 46 are women. The previous record was in 2008, when 41 female MPs were elected.

Ethnic composition

References

Notes

2017 New Zealand general election
Election results in New Zealand